Yury Ivanovich ((23 March 14803 August 1536) was the second surviving son of Ivan the Great by Sophia of Byzantium. Since 1519, his appanages included Dmitrovskoe knjazevstvo.

When his elder brother Vasily III ascended to the throne, Yury was 24 years old. Like his other brothers, he was forbidden to marry until Vasily could produce an heir and even then he was not allowed to marry without the ruler's permission. For Yury Ivanovich this permission never came because after his brother's death in 1533 his widow and regent for the young Ivan IV, Elena Glinskaya, began to suspect Yury.  

Not long after that Yury was arrested and put in prison where he died of starvation in 1536.

Ancestry

References
Иван III Васильевич

1480 births
1536 deaths
Rurik dynasty
People of the Grand Duchy of Moscow
15th-century Russian people
16th-century Russian people
Russian people who died in prison custody
Prisoners who died in Russian detention
People of Byzantine descent